The Very Best of Janie is a compilation album by American country artist Janie Fricke. It was released in October 1985 via Columbia Records and contained ten tracks of previously released material. The disc was the second compilation record released in Fricke's career. It featured her most successful singles released during the mid-1980s. The album reached a charting position on the American country LP's survey in 1985.

Background, content and reception

In 1982 Columbia Records issued Janie Fricke's first compilation of Greatest Hits. Following the disc, she went on to reach further success in her music career. The material from 1982's It Ain't Easy and 1983's Love Lies, featured up-tempo production and country-pop melodies that spawned some of her biggest hits on the country charts. This prompted Columbia to issue a second Columbia compilation in 1985 titled The Very Best of Janie. The album featured her major hits recorded between 1982 and 1985. These songs were recorded at The Bennett House and the Soundshop Studio, both located in Tennessee. All songs on the project were originally produced by Bob Montgomery.

The Very Best of Janie contained a total of ten tracks, all previously recorded. Six of the album's material were originally number one singles on the Billboard country songs chart including "It Ain't Easy Bein' Easy", "Tell Me a Lie" and "Your Heart's Not in It". Three more tracks on the album originally reached the top ten on the same Billboard chart. The album was originally released in October 1985 on Columbia Records as a vinyl LP, cassette and a compact disc.  In later decades, it was released to digital platforms including Apple Music. The album spent 37 weeks on the Billboard country albums chart and peaked at number 33. AllMusic's Jason Ankeny the album a 4.5 star rating and called it "one of the best anthologies of her work to date."

Track listings

Vinyl and cassette versions

Compact disc and digital versions

Personnel
All credits are adapted from the liner notes of The Very Best of Janie.

Technical personnel
 Bob Montgomery – Producer
 Danny Purcell – Mastering

Charts

Release history

References

1982 compilation albums
Columbia Records compilation albums
Janie Fricke compilation albums